The Fields of Death is the fourth and final book in Simon Scarrow's Wellington and Napoleon Quartet, which tells the story of the French Revolution and the Napoleonic Wars from the point of view of Sir Arthur Wellesley (the future Duke of Wellington) and Napoleon Bonaparte.

Plot

The book covers the time period between April 1809, and 1815, the climax of the conflict at the battle of Waterloo. At the start of the novel, Napoleon is facing increasing pressure as his marshals are repeatedly defeated by Arthur Wellesley, leading the allied armies of Britain and Spain. The plot of the novel revolves around Napoleon's wars in central Europe, and failed invasion of Russia, as his armies rapidly lose men and their reputation for invincibility. Running parallel to this story, Arthur Wellesley is leading the allied forces to victory in the Peninsular War, before invading Southern France. The novel ends with Napoleon and Wellington finally meeting in battle, at Waterloo.

Wellington and Napoleon Quartet
2010 British novels
Fiction set in the 1810s
Works about the Battle of Waterloo
Headline Publishing Group books